The  2019 Rising Phoenix World Championships was an IFBB Wings of Strength female professional bodybuilding competition and held in conjunction with the IFBB Arizona Pro and NPC Arizona Women's Extravaganza. It was held on September 6, 2019 to September 7, 2019 at the Wild Horse Pass Hotel & Casino in Chandler, Arizona.

Results

Overall results
1st - Helle Trevino
2nd - Margaret Martin
3rd - Irene Andersen
4th - Nicole Chartrand
5th - Monique Jones
6th - Theresa Ivancik
7th - Andrea Shaw
8th - Janeen Lankowski
9th - Mona Poursaleh
10th - Aleesha Young
11th - Silvia Matta
12th - Kim Buck
13th - Pauline Nelson
14th - Jessica Martin
15th - Barbara Carita
16th - Robin Hillis
16th - Susanna Jacobs  
16th - Kristina Mendoza
16th - Tina Williams

Comparison to previous Rising Phoenix World Championships results:

+2 - Alina Popa
-1 - Margaret Martin
-1 - Sheila Bleck
+8 - Nicole Chartrand
-4 - Helle Trevino
-2 - Virginia Sanchez
+4 - Maria Mikola
+1 - Jacqueline Fuchs
-10 - Wendy McCready
Same - Cristina Franzoso
Same - Pauline Nelson
Same - Angela Rayburn
-3 - Isabelle Turell

Scorecard

Best poser results
1st - Mona Poursaleh
2nd - Janeen Lankowski
3rd - Nicole Chartrand
4th - Kristina Mendoza
5th - Theresa Ivancik

Comparison to previous Rising Phoenix World Championships results: 

-1 - Sheila Bleck
Same - Pauline Nelson

Best intro results
 1st - Silvia Matta
 2nd - Alesha Young
 3rd - Nicki Chartrand

Most muscular winner
Winner - Aleesha Young

Comparison to previous Rising Phoenix World Championships results: 

+1 - Helle Trevino
-1 - Aleesha Young

Prize money

Overall award prize money
1st - $50,000 + $100,000 brand-new top of the line iconic American prize vehicle
2nd - $25,000
3rd - $12,500
4th - $7,500
5th - $5,000
Total: $100,000 + $100,000 Dodge Challenger Hellcat

Best poser award prize money
This award was sponsored by Elevation Solar and MuscleGirlzLive.

1st - $5,000 and an all-expense-paid trip to the 2019 Olympia
2nd - $2,500 and an all-expense-paid trip to the 2019 Olympia
3rd - $1,500 and an all-expense-paid trip to the 2019 Olympia
4th - An all-expense-paid trip to the 2019 Olympia 
5th - An all-expense-paid trip to the 2019 Olympia 
Total: $9,000

Best intro video award prize money
This award was sponsored by Offerpad.com and HerBiceps.

1st - $5,000
2nd - $2,000
3rd - $1,500
Total: $8,000

Most muscular award prize money
This award was sponsored by Muscle Angels and x2x.

Total: $7,000

2019 Rising Phoenix World Championships Qualified

Points standings

 In the event of a tie, the competitor with the best top five contest placings will be awarded the qualification. If both competitors have the same contest placings, than both will qualify for the Rising Phoenix World Championships.

See also
2019 Mr. Olympia

External links 
 Official homepage

References

Rising Phoenix World Championships
Wings of Strength
History of female bodybuilding
Female professional bodybuilding competitions